UME Cinemas is a Chinese cinema chain. As of December 2015, it had 25 cinemas and 400 screens in China.

References

Cinema chains in China